Mirosław may refer to:

People 
Mirosław (given name), a Polish given name of Slavic origin

Places 
Gmina Mirosławiec, an urban-rural gmina in Wałcz County, West Pomeranian Voivodeship, Poland
Mirosławice (disambiguation), several places in Poland
Mirosławice, Lower Silesian Voivodeship (south-west Poland)
Mirosław, Masovian Voivodeship (east-central Poland)
Mirosław, Greater Poland Voivodeship (west-central Poland)
Mirosławiec, a town in Wałcz County, West Pomeranian Voivodeship, Poland

See also 
 Miroslav (given name), the Slavic name upon which Mirosław is based

pl:Mirosław